Tornillo is a census-designated place (CDP) and border town in El Paso County, Texas, United States. The population was 1,568 at the 2010 census. It is part of the El Paso Metropolitan Statistical Area. The Tornillo and Guadalupe, Chihuahua, area is connected by the Tornillo-Guadalupe Bridge.

The town is the home of Sonic Ranch, the world's largest residential recording complex. In June 2018, the US government opened a tent city detention camp for migrant children at the Marcelino Serna Port of Entry on the Mexican border in Tornillo. The ZIP Codes encompassing the CDP area are 79838 and 79853.
By 11 January 2019 the last migrant child had been moved out of the camp, and was now en route to, or placed with, vetted sponsors.

Geography
Tornillo is located at  (31.439308, -106.095580).

The city is located on State Highway 20 and the Southern Pacific Railroad.

Climate
According to the Köppen Climate Classification system, Tornillo has a semi-arid climate, abbreviated "BSk" on climate maps. Temperatures reach an average high of 96 °F and average low of 62 °F in June, and an average high of 59 °F and average low of 28 °F in December. The annual average rainfall is 9.25 inches.

Demographics

2020 census

As of the 2020 United States census, there were 1,432 people, 337 households, and 281 families residing in the CDP.

2000 census
As of the census of 2000, there were 1,609 people, 394 households, and 366 families residing in the CDP. The population density was 470.4 people per square mile (181.6/km2). There were 437 housing units at an average density of 127.8/sq mi (49.3/km2). The racial makeup of the CDP was 97.2% White, 0.56% Native American, 1.58% from other races, and 0.68% from two or more races. Hispanic or Latino were 99.13% of the population.

There were 394 households, out of which 67.0% had children under the age of 18 living with them, 73.1% were married couples living together, 14.5% had a female householder with no husband present, and 6.9% were non-families. 6.6% of all households were made up of individuals, and 2.8% had someone living alone who was 65 years of age or older. The average household size was 4.08 and the average family size was 4.27.

In the CDP, the population was spread out, with 44.0% under the age of 18, 11.2% from 18 to 24, 27.8% from 25 to 44, 11.9% from 45 to 64, and 5.2% who were 65 years of age or older. The median age was 22 years. For every 100 females, there were 92.7 males. For every 100 females age 18 and over, there were 87.3 males.

The median income for a household in the CDP was $19,514, and the median income for a family was $20,329. Males had a median income of $16,955 versus $15,761 for females. The per capita income for the CDP was $5,778. About 36.6% of families and 36.8% of the population were below the poverty line, including 40.4% of those under age 18 and 40.2% of those age 65 or over.

Celebrity former residents include Pro Jockey Willie Shoemaker and Los Angeles radio personality Jamey Karr.

Education
Almost all of Tornillo is served by the Tornillo Independent School District. A small portion lies within the Fabens Independent School District.

History 
Tornillo was first platted in 1909 by a group of businessmen from El Paso, Texas who had formed the Tornillo Townsite Company. The first post office in the town opened the same year. Tornillo became the first agricultural area to be approved as part of the Rio Grande Irrigation Project after 1916. Cotton became the main crop in the region, however, by 1970, pecans were also a major agricultural crop in the area.

References

 
Census-designated places in El Paso County, Texas
Census-designated places in Texas